East Freehold is an unincorporated community and census-designated place (CDP) located within Freehold Township, in Monmouth County, New Jersey, United States. As of the 2010 United States Census, the CDP's population was 4,894.

Geography
According to the United States Census Bureau, the CDP had a total area of 2.973 square miles (7.701 km2), including 2.965 square miles (7.680 km2) of land and 0.008 square miles (0.020 km2) of water (0.27%).

Demographics

Census 2010

Census 2000
As of the 2000 United States Census there were 4,936 people, 1,643 households, and 1,396 families living in the CDP. The population density was 646.0/km2 (1,670.7/mi2). There were 1,664 housing units at an average density of 217.8/km2 (563.2/mi2). The racial makeup of the CDP was 86.71% White, 3.69% African American, 0.04% Native American, 7.27% Asian, 0.02% Pacific Islander, 0.91% from other races, and 1.36% from two or more races. Hispanic or Latino of any race were 3.85% of the population.

There were 1,643 households, out of which 46.6% had children under the age of 18 living with them, 77.0% were married couples living together, 6.0% had a female householder with no husband present, and 15.0% were non-families. 12.4% of all households were made up of individuals, and 3.2% had someone living alone who was 65 years of age or older. The average household size was 3.00 and the average family size was 3.30.

In the CDP the population was spread out, with 29.9% under the age of 18, 5.3% from 18 to 24, 32.1% from 25 to 44, 25.6% from 45 to 64, and 7.2% who were 65 years of age or older. The median age was 37 years. For every 100 females, there were 95.9 males. For every 100 females age 18 and over, there were 94.3 males.

The median income for a household in the CDP was $93,548, and the median income for a family was $102,756. Males had a median income of $71,215 versus $38,060 for females. The per capita income for the CDP was $35,119. About 1.7% of families and 2.6% of the population were below the poverty line, including 3.5% of those under age 18 and 7.0% of those age 65 or over.

References

Neighborhoods in Freehold Township, New Jersey
Census-designated places in Monmouth County, New Jersey